James Edward MacMurdo (September 2, 1909 – August 11, 1981) was an American football tackle in the National Football League for the Boston Braves/Redskins and Philadelphia Eagles.  He played college football at the University of Pittsburgh.

References

1909 births
1981 deaths
Players of American football from Pennsylvania
American football tackles
Boston Braves (NFL) players
Boston Redskins players
Philadelphia Eagles players
Pittsburgh Panthers football players
People from Ellwood City, Pennsylvania